The 2016–17 season was Morecambe's tenth consecutive season in League Two, the fourth tier of English football. They finished 18th in League Two, and also competed in the FA Cup, EFL Cup and EFL Trophy. They were eliminated in the first round in the FA Cup and the second round in the latter two.

The season page covers the period between 1 July 2016 and 30 June 2017.

Competitions

Pre-season friendlies

League Two

League table

Matches

FA Cup

EFL Cup

EFL Trophy

Transfers

In

Out

Loans in

See also
List of Morecambe F.C. seasons

References

Morecambe F.C. seasons
Morecambe